Baruch Sheptarani It is a blessing (Berakhah) used by Jews that the boy's father blesses when his son reaches the age of thirteen (bar mitzvah). The blessing is greeted by Jews immediately after the boy made Aliyah.

The first source for this blessing is in Midrash Rabbah on Parshas Toldot. On the verse "And the boys grew up and there was Esau a man who knew a hunter a man of a field and Jacob a man of innocence sat a tent", On this the Midrash says "Rabbi Phinehas in the name of Rabbi Levy: "A parable of the myrtle and thorn plant that grew on top of each other. Once grown, one has a scent but the other has hooks. Thus every thirteen years Jacob and Esau went to school and returned from school, after 13 years one would go to "Beit Midrash" and one would go to "Idolatry". Rabbi Elazar said in the name of Rabbi Shimon: A man should take care of his son for 13 years, from now on he should say: Blessed be God who released me from the punishment of this boy"

Text of Baruch Sheptarani

The blessing today 
In Shulchan Aruch the existence of this blessing was not mentioned at all, but the Rama wrote:
Some say that he whose son has become a "bar mitzvah" will bless "Blessed are you, O Lord our God, the King of the world who has released me from the punishment of this."

But the Rema objected and added "but it is good to bless without Shem U Malchut.

Rabbi Yechiel Michel Epstein in his book Aruch Hashulchan wrote: "and many used to bless with Shem U Malchut when the bar mitzvah boy made Aliyah Latora."

References

External links 
 Rabbi Eliezer Melamed, Bar Mitzvah and the Torah in Peninei Halakha in Hebrew
 “Baruch Sheptarani” – Laws and Customs in DinOnline

Jewish prayer and ritual texts
Jewish blessings